Istgah-e Azadvar (also Romanized as Istgāh Āzādvār) is a village in Pain Jovin Rural District, Helali District, Joghatai County, Razavi Khorasan Province, Iran. At the 2006 census, its population was 1,004, in 252 families.

References 

Populated places in Joghatai County